Our Dumb Animals was an American animal welfare magazine published by the Massachusetts Society for the Prevention of Cruelty to Animals; it was created by George T. Angell, the founder of the society. The magazine was first published in 1868 and remained in publication until 1970. For the first issue, over 200,000 copies were distributed, with Boston police officers distributing 25,000 of them. Free copies were delivered to newspaper editors, legislators, clergy, and teachers. The use of the word "dumb" in its title was not intended to disparage non-human animals, but to refer to their lack of capacity for speech; the motto "We Speak For Those Who Cannot Speak For Themselves" was printed on every cover. 

Its content included news about the organization's activities and members, news of pending legislation, humane education in the form of essays and fiction ("animal morality tales") and reports on cruel treatment towards animals, which was contrasted with the virtues of the animals being harmed, such as their intelligence and faithfulness. The magazine is considered important in the development of the early animal advocacy movement.

See also
 Bands of Mercy

References

External links

 Our Dumb Animals at the Library of Congress
 
Our Dumb Animals at the Internet Archive

1868 establishments in Massachusetts
1970 disestablishments in Massachusetts
Humane education
Magazines about animal welfare
Monthly magazines published in the United States
Magazines established in 1868
Magazines disestablished in 1970
Magazines published in Boston